Chlorobis(dppe)iron hydride is a coordination complex with the formula HFeCl(dppe)2, where dppe is the bidentate ligand 1,2-bis(diphenylphosphino)ethane. It is a red-violet solid.  The compound has attracted much attention as a precursor to dihydrogen complexes.

Structure
The complex exhibits octahedral molecular geometry. The chloride and hydride ligands are mutually trans. The bond distances between the iron metal atom and the coordinating ligands are given by the following:

Synthesis and reactions
The compound is synthesized according to the following idealized reaction: 
FeCl2 + 2 dppe + Na[BH4] → NaCl + ½ B2H6 +  HFeCl(dppe)2

In the course of this conversion, high-spin complex FeCl2(dppe)2 converts to low-spin HFeCl(dppe)2.

The complex HFeCl[(dppe)2 exhibits a number of reactions associated with the remaining Fe-Cl bond. Reaction of the complex with sodium borohydride gives the dihydride complex:
HFeCl(dppe)2  +  NaBH4   →   H2Fe(dppe)2  +  NaCl  +  "BH3"

Removal of chloride using sodium tetrafluorborate under and atmostphere of hydrogen or nitrogen gives the dinitrogen and dihydrogen complexes:
HFeCl(dppe)2  +  NaBF4  +  N2  →   [HFe(N2)(dppe)2]BF4  +  NaCl
HFeCl(dppe)2  +  NaBF4  +  H2  →   [HFe(H2)(dppe)2]BF4  +  NaCl

References

Metal hydrides
Iron(II) compounds
Chloro complexes
Phosphine complexes
Iron complexes